Robert Crause Baden-Powell, 3rd Baron Baden-Powell (15 October 1936 – 28 December 2019) was the elder son of Carine Boardman and Peter Baden-Powell, 2nd Baron Baden-Powell, and a grandson of Robert Baden-Powell, 1st Baron Baden-Powell, and Olave Baden-Powell.

Family and personal life
He was born in Johannesburg, South Africa, the elder son of Peter Baden-Powell, later 2nd Baron Baden-Powell and Carine Boardman of Johannesburg, and lived in Southern Rhodesia (now Zimbabwe). After his father inherited the peerage, the family moved from Rhodesia to Britain in 1949, when he was 12. He was educated at Bryanston School and played viola in the school orchestra. On 1 August 1963, he married Patience Hélène Mary Batty (27 October 1936 – 18 December 2010), only daughter of Major Douglas Myers Batty, of Melsetter, Southern Rhodesia and Elsie May Loker. They subsequently realized that they had been at primary school together in Southern Rhodesia. He enjoyed swimming, fishing, model making, gardening, bee keeping, badminton and music and kept and bred American Quarter Horses. He died, childless, at home in the early hours of Saturday, 28 December 2019, after a long battle with cancer.

Career
He did National Service in the Royal Navy, became a leading seaman, and during the Suez Crisis, served on HMS Bulwark. He then set up a liquor business in Nottingham called "Whisky a Gogo" and spent time as a motor car salesman, wine merchant and public relations officer with the BBC. From 1964 to 1984, he was a local authority finance broker in the City of London. He held several directorships:
 Founder and chairman, London and Cheshire Insurance Company (1961–1966) (company collapsed 1966)
 Director, City Share Trust (1964–1970)
 Director, Bolton Building Society (1974–1988)
 Managing Director, Fieldguard Limited (family private company) from 1984 until his death.
 Director, London board of the Cheltenham & Gloucester Building Society. 
 Director of a number of unit trusts (now part of F&C) and of other companies.

Scouting & community organisations
He participated in Scouting:
 1946 – became Wolf Cub in Southern Rhodesia
 1959–1962 – Assistant Scout Leader, 100th Nottingham Group
 1965–1969 – Group Scout Leader and Venture Scout Leader, 6th Putney Group
 leader – Ripley Venture Scout Unit

The Scout Association positions: 
 1968–1982 – Chief Scout's commissioner 
 1972–1988 – president of West Yorkshire Scout Council
 1972–1978 – member of the committee of council (now board of trustees) 
 1973–1981 – member of the general purposes sub-committee (1973–1981)
 1973 – The Scout Association's delegation leader at the World Scout Conference in Nairobi
 The Scout Association's delegation member at two other World Scout Conferences
 1975 – British contingent leader 14th World Scout Jamboree at Lillehammer, Norway
 1977, 1981 and 1983 – deputy camp chief at two Canadian Scout Jamborees and 15th World Scout Jamboree in Canada
 1981–2019 – vice-president (1981–2019)

He received:
 The Scout Association's Silver Acorn and Silver Wolf
 Scouts Canada's Silver Fox, 1983.
 World Organization of the Scout Movement's (Bronze Wolf), 1983

He was:
 President, Surrey Council for Voluntary Youth Services, 2010–2019
 President, Camping and Caravanning Club, 1992–2002 and vice president, 2002–2019
 President, Camping and Caravanning Club, 1991–2002
 Member, various Quarter Horse bodies, 1983–1991 and established Quarter Horse racing in the UK, chairman of Quarter Horse Racing UK (1985–1988), member of the British Quarter Horse Association, 1984–1989, and Chairman in 1990
 Governor, Glenesk School, 1986–2005
 Surrey Rural Housing Committee, 1985–1990
 Chairman, Sheldon Grange Housing Association.
 Ripley, Surrey, Parish Council, 1977–1986
 Liveryman of the Worshipful Company of Mercers, of which his grandfather had been master.

Wife
Upon marriage, his wife became Lady Baden-Powell and served with many charities, including the YWCA, Girls Alone in London, the National Playbus Association, NSPCC, Commonwealth Youth Exchange Council, SPCK, Surrey Council for Voluntary Youth Services, Surrey Antiques Fair, Walton Firs Camp Site, as well as various local and national offices of the Girl Guides, for which she became Commonwealth Chief Commissioner and, latterly, a vice-president. She was a Vice-President of the Scout Association. She also conducted a successful business life and was a director of Imperial Life of Canada, Surrey Radio, and Fieldguard Limited (a family private company). She was appointed a CBE for her services to youth and was a Deputy Lord Lieutenant for Surrey. She died childless, of motor neuron disease, in 2010.

Arms

References

1936 births
2019 deaths
Barons Baden-Powell
People educated at Bryanston School
Royal Navy officers
Scouting and Guiding in the United Kingdom
Robert
Recipients of the Bronze Wolf Award
Deaths from cancer in England
Baden-Powell